Michael Stuart (born 1975) is a Puerto Rican-American salsa singer and actor.

Michael Stuart may also refer to:

Michael Stuart (physician), American sports physician and orthopedic surgeon
Mike Stuart (born 1980), ice hockey player
Michael-Joel David Stuart (born 1997), actor
Michael B. Stuart (born 1967), United States Attorney for the Southern District of West Virginia

See also
Michael Stewart (disambiguation)

Stuart (name)